The Mosuo are a small ethnic group living in Yunnan and Sichuan provinces in China, close to the border with Tibet. Dubbed the 'Kingdom of Women' by the Chinese, the Mosuo population of about 50,000 live near Lugu Lake in the Tibetan Himalayas .

Scholars use diverse terms and spellings to designate the Mosuo culture. Most prefer 'Mosuo' some spell it 'Moso', while a minority use neither term, but refer to them as the Na people.

The Mosuo people are known as the 'Kingdom of Women' because the Na are a matrilineal society: heterosexual activity occurs only by mutual consent and mostly through the custom of the secret nocturnal 'visit'; men and women are free to have multiple partners, and to initiate or break off relationships when they please.

The origin of matrilineality and matriarchy

Introduction 
Matrilineal cultures trace descent through the female line. It can also be considered a society in which one identifies with one's mother's lineage including familial lineage or property inheritance.

Matriarchal cultures are run by women. Women hold primary power, predominate in roles of political leadership, moral authority, social privilege and control of property at the specific exclusion of men, at least to a large degree.

Technically, Mosuo culture is matrilineal, but many anthropologists classify the Mosuo tribe as a "matriarchal society". The Mosuo themselves sometimes use the term matriarchal to describe their culture in order to bring more tourism and interest into their culture. Mosuo culture does have characteristics of a matriarchal society, in that women are the head of the household, the property is passed down through the female line, and the women make business decisions; yet political power tends to be in the hands of males, disqualifying them from matriarchy status (although, according to one NPR article, there was once a time when the political leaders of Mosuo villages were female). Nevertheless, some anthropologists, like Peggy Reeves Sanday, determine that societies like Mosuo are in fact matriarchies. They note that, rather than a simple mirror of a patriarchal society, a matriarchy "emphasizes maternal meanings where 'maternal symbols are linked to social practices influencing the lives of both sexes and where women play a central role in these practices'". These scholars thus favour redefining and reintroducing the word matriarchy, especially in reference to modern matrilineal societies like the Mosuo.

Beginning of Mosuo matrilineality 
The Mosuo are a small ethnic group living around China's Lugu Lake in the provinces of Sichuan and Yunnan. Most Mosuo people celebrate a matrilineal culture, tracing lineage through the female side of the family.

Historically the Mosuo lived in a feudal system where a larger peasant population was controlled by a small nobility. The nobility was afraid of the peasant class gaining power. Since leadership was hereditary, the peasant class was given a matriarchal system. This prevented threats to nobility power by having the peasant class trace lineage through the female line. This system has led to numerous distinct traits among Mosuo society.

Mosuo girls become Mosuo women 
A Mosuo girl is considered a woman after she has participated in the coming of age ceremony.  This ceremony, observed between the ages of 12 and 14, marks a Mosuo girl's transition to womanhood as well as a Mosuo man's transition into manhood.  Here women are introduced to skirts and men to pants.

Prior to the coming of age ceremony, Mosuo children dress the same and are restricted from certain aspects of Mosuo life, namely religious ceremonies.

After the coming of age ceremony, Mosuo women are allowed their own private bedroom within the household in which they live; men are not afforded this advantage.

Mosuo 'marriage' 
The Mosuo men practice tisese which translates as walking marriage in Chinese. However, the Mosuo term literally means 'goes back and forth'.

Women have the choice to invite men of interest to their private sleeping room. If the man does not reciprocate this desire, he may simply never visit the woman's household. Men perform tisese in the true sense of the word. They can seek entry into the sleeping chambers of any woman they desire who also desires them. When feelings are reciprocal, a man will be allowed into a woman's private sleeping area. There he will spend the night and walk back to his mother's home in the early morning.

Male suitors have been known to commonly descend into a woman's bedding chamber from a designated opening in the ceiling, commonly using a grappling hook, or modern rock climbing apparatus.

Anthropologist Cai Hua termed tisese as 'furtive' or 'closed' visiting, meaning no public acknowledgement or obligations are required between parties. At night Mosuo adults are free to experience sexuality with as many or as few partners as they wish.

Though a Mosuo woman is allowed to change partners whenever she likes, having only one sexual partner is not uncommon. Typically walking marriages are long term. During these unions a woman may become pregnant by the same man multiple times. But when children are born, they become a responsibility of the woman's family. Instead of marrying and sharing family life with spouses, adult Mosuo children remain in extended, multigenerational households with their mother and her blood relatives.

Typical Mosuo home 
Mosuo matrilineality is largely based on the woman's role as head of the household. The Mosuo generally live in large extended families with many generations under one roof. Children in a household are taken care of by their mother's family. Their only male influences are their mother's brothers.

Women who have participated in the coming of age ceremony are allotted a private room. Otherwise the typical Mosuo home consists of communal quarters, with no other private bedrooms or living areas.

Mosuo anthropology

Walking marriage vs. monogamous marriage 
Anthropologists believe the premodern Mosuo family system has withstood modern Chinese marriage practices (identical to Western monogamous marriages) for many reasons.  The practice of walking marriage allows two people to pursue intimacy as equals purely for the sake of satisfaction.

Mosuo family principles challenge some of the world's most popular beliefs about marriage, parenting, and family life. The following are convictions about marriage that scholars, politicians, and citizens from the East and West (including traditional Chinese patriarchy) believe are true of family and kinship:
 Marriage is a universal institution.
 The quality and stability of a couple's marriage profoundly affects their children's welfare and security.
 Parents who engage in multiple, short-term, extra-marital sexual liaisons irresponsibly threaten their children's emotional development.

The Mosuo family life offers an exception that questions these convictions. Traditional Mosuo families value sexuality and romance separate from domesticity, parenting, caretaking, and economic situation. A Mosuo woman's sex life is strictly voluntary and nocturnal while her family life is a daily obligation.

Mosuo culture and female sexual freedom 
The practice of tisese allows Mosuo women to avoid the double standard that regulates women's sexuality in other cultures. Women's sexual behaviors are judged equally. Girls and boys alike are raised learning to express sexuality to the same degree.

The traditional Mosuo family and kinship affords women an equality and agency over their sexual and procreative lives that is rare in most cultures. Romantic and sexual unions are governed solely by the woman and man involved. Other family members are unconcerned with the romantic lives of their offspring.

Mosuo women enjoy a freedom from reproductive demands that is unique among modern global cultures.

Today 
Though the practice of tisese is a traditional Mosuo practice, today many couples have redefined the term. Many choose to cement their intimate bond through a small ceremony during which, in keeping with the secrecy of nocturnal visits, a representative of the man presents gifts to his lover's kin. After many presents have been given, the ceremony allows a man to openly visit his lover to assist with daily tasks or visit with her household. Still, whenever a man spends the night with a lover, even after such ceremony, he must return to his maternal residence in the morning.

Tourism 

The rural area of the Mosuo Lugu Lake has only recently experienced modern developments. When the society became known as the 'Kingdom of Women', tourists began to flock to the area. The Mosuo responded to these visitors by building hotels and other attractions to bring more visitors. Many Mosuo women make a living managing these hotels.

The idea of 'walking marriages' has convinced many visitors that the Mosuo lead a salacious sexual life. It is common for visitors to flirt with the local Mosuo women in an effort to seduce them.

More info 

 Mosuo
 Sambandam

References

Further reading 
 Harrell, Stevan. "The Anthropology of Reform and the Reform of Anthropology: Anthropological Narratives of Recovery and Progress in China". Annual Review of Anthropology 30 (2001): 139–161. doi: 10.1146/annurev.anthro.30.1.139.
 Hershatter, Gail. Women in China's Long Twentieth Century. Berkeley: University of California Press, 2007. Global, Area, and International Archives. 
 Hershatter, Gail. "State of the Field: Women in China's Long Twentieth Century". Journal of Asian Studies 63.4 (2004): 991–1065. doi: 10.1017/S0021911804002396.
 Mathieu, Christine. A History and Anthropological Study of the Ancient Kingdoms of the Sino-Tibetan Borderland: Naxi and Mosuo. Edwin Mellen, 2003. Mellen Studies in Anthropology 11.
 Namu, Yang Erche. Leaving Mother Lake: A Girlhood at the Edge of the World. Boston: Little, Brown, 2003.
 Shih, Chuan-kang. "Genesis of Marriage among the Moso and Empire-Building in Late Imperial China". Journal of Asian Studies 60.2 (2001): 381–412. doi: 10.2307/2659698.
 Shih, Chuan-kang, and Mark R. Jenike. "A Cultural-Historical Perspective on the Depressed Fertility Among the Matrilineal Moso in Southwest China". Human Ecology 30.1 (2002): 21–47. doi: 10.1023/A:1014579404548.

Ethnic groups in China
Matriarchy
Ethnic groups in Yunnan